Rara Lake also known as Mahendra Lake is the largest fresh water lake in the Nepalese Himalayas. It is the main feature of Rara National Park, located in Jumla and Mugu Districts of Karnali Province.

History 
Rara Lake was included as part of Rara National Park in 1976. In 1976, citizens of the two villages Chapra and Rara were resettled to Nepalgunj. In September 2007, it was declared as a Ramsar site, covering  including the surrounding wetland. Currently, this area along with the national park is being protected by the Nepali Army.

Features
It drains into the Mugu Karnali River via the Nijar River. Its water quality is characterized by high pH, conductivity and total hardness. It has been classified as oligotrophic as it is slightly polluted. The lake changes its colour up to 5 times a day depending on the climate. Rara Lake is surrounded by thickly forested hills named Chuchemara Danda at 4,087 meters and Murma at 3630m. Behind the hills, the beautiful view of Saipal Mountain of Himalayan Range can be seen from the lake. One revolution of the lake by foot takes almost five hours. During, summer season, birds as far as Siberia can be found migrating to this area.

Socio-cultural and religious values

The main occupation of the people living around the area is agriculture. People also rear goats and extract medicinal herbs and sell them for their living. Thakur society is dominant in the community. Thakur Baba’s Temple is situated in the southeast corner of the lake. Local people believe that the god Thakur shot an arrow to open the passage of the lake reducing the damage caused by flooding.

Flora and fauna

Rara Lake, being surrounded by Rara National Park, has unique floral and faunal importance with rare and vulnerable species. The park was established in 1976 to preserve the beauty of the lake and protect it from sedimentation and adverse human activities. The Park flora consists of 1074 species, of which 16 are endemic to Nepal; the fauna includes 51 species of mammals and 214 species of birds. The hills surrounding the lake  is covered with coniferous forest like Himalayan cypress, West Himalayan Spruce, Black Juniper and Oak . The national flower of the country Rhododendron can also be found here.

The lake holds three endemic fish species Nepalese snowtrout (Schizothorax macrophthalmus), (S. nepalensis) and the Rara snowtrout (S. raraensis) and one endemic frog, Rara Lake frog (Nanorana rarica). Rara snowtrout (S. raraensis), is the fish recorded only in this lake. 236 different species of birds can be found in the lake. Winter visitor water birds such as gadwall (Anas strepera), mallard (Anas platyrhynchos), northern shoveler (Anas clypeata), common teal (Anas crecca), tufted duck (Aythya fuligula), common golden eye (Bucephala clangula), common merganser (Mergus merganser), common coot (Fulica atra), and solitary snipe (Gallinago solitaria) reside and rest at this lake.

Climate

Summer is quite pleasant but winter is cold. The best visiting time to the lake is September/October and April to May. From December to March, the temperatures go low below the freezing point, and heavy snowfall occur up to one meter, blocking the way to the lake. April to June is warm in this region.

Monsoon season between the months of July to October. The surface temperature of the lake was found to be  and was visible below .

Transport 

Even though the lake does not have connection to the national road network, there are two ways to reach Rara Lake- airways and roadways. Roadways, it takes four days to reach Rara from Kathmandu through the Karnali Highway and takes up to three days from the nearest town Jumla through means of trekking. From, Nepalgunj there is two ways to reach the lake, one is by following the salt route to Humla and another following a number of trails through Dolpo region. Through air, the nearest airport to the Rara lake is Talcha Airport in Mugu and Jumla Airport in Jumla. There is no direct air service from Kathmandu to Mugu. Talcha can be reached from air only by getting down from Kathmandu to Nepalgunj or Surkhet.  Rara Lake is mainly served by Talcha Airport, which is 4 km east of the lake. Nepal Airlines, Sita Air , Summit Air,  and Tara Air operate flights to both Talcha Airport and Jumla Airport from Nepalgunj Airport. It takes approx. 3 hours to reach Rara Lake from Talcha Airport on foot. Apart from this, a public bus also runs from Surkhet to Mugu headquarter Gamgadhi. It is possible to reach from Surkhet through the Karnali Highway to Manma in Kalikot and Badki in Jumla by road. Rara can be reached after about 3 hours of walking from Badki by foot.

Environmental issues 
Due to over-grazing and defecation, the national park conservation officers are facing a challenge to preserve the lake. Local people are found cutting timber wood and fuel wood, which is a problem for conservation of Rara. Also during festivals visitors and local people produce a lot of wastage causing water pollution. Rara has the potential of becoming the next major place for tourists to visit. During 1997–1998, the number of tourists visiting to this place was found to be 560, but in 2007 it decreased to 87 individuals.

See also

References

External links
 www.rara-lake.com
Trek to Rara Laka - Details and Photo Feature
Flickr : Rara Lake

Rara
Mugu District
Karnali Province
Lakes of Nepal